The Grammy Award for Best Children's Album (from 2020: Grammy Award for Best Children's Music Album) is an honor presented since 2012 at the Grammy Awards, a ceremony that was established in 1958 and originally called the Gramophone Awards. Honors in various categories are presented at the ceremony annually by the National Academy of Recording Arts and Sciences of the United States to "honor artistic achievement, technical proficiency and overall excellence in the recording industry, without regard to album sales or chart position."

History
The Best Children's Album award is given to recording artists for works containing quality performances aimed at children. The award has had several minor name changes:

From 1959 to 1960 the award was known as Best Recording for Children
In 1961 it was awarded as Best Album Created for Children
From 1962 to 1968 it was awarded as Best Recording for Children
In 1969 no award was given in the Children's Field
From 1970 to 1991 it was awarded as Best Recording for Children
From 1992 to 1993 it was awarded as Best Album for Children
From 1994 to 2011 the award category was split into Best Musical Album for Children and Best Spoken Word Album for Children
From 2012 to 2019 it was known as Best Children's Album, after the Best Musical Album for Children and Best Spoken Word Album for Children categories were merged (basically returning to the situation as it was prior to 1994, although with a small name change).
In 2020, spoken-word children's albums were moved to the Best Spoken Word Album category. The category was renamed Best Children's Music Album.
 
The 2012 restructuring of these and other categories was a result of the Recording Academy's wish to decrease the list of categories and awards. According to the Academy, "[it] passed the proposal that a return to one category for all types of recordings for children, as it was from 1958-1993, would be most appropriate in this new context.".

Recipients

Multiple wins

References

External links
Official site of the Grammy Awards
Neela Vaswani's biography on her own site

Children's Album
Children's albums
Album awards